Action Action is an American indie rock band, formerly signed to Victory Records.

History
Action Action formed in 2004 from the ashes of The Reunion Show, Count The Stars and Diffuser. The band signed with Victory Records and released their first album, Don't Cut Your Fabric to This Year's Fashion (2004), and released their second album An Army of Shapes Between Wars in 2006. In the same year, Action Action toured with Maxeen, Morningwood, The Sounds, Jonezetta, We Are The Fury, The Cult and Something for Rockets on various legs of their US tours.

The song "Paper Cliché" was featured in the video game, MVP 06: NCAA Baseball.

Their song "Dream Within A Dream" was featured in a 2009 Gillette commercial. The song was included on their self-released 2010 album The Ones Who Get It Are The Ones Who Need Not To Know.

Line-up
Mark Thomas Kluepfel (vocals, synth, guitar, songwriter)
Adam Manning (guitar)
Dan Leo (drums, percussion)

Former members
Clarke Foley (bass)
Kris Baldwin (guitar)

Discography

Albums
Don't Cut Your Fabric to This Year's Fashion (Victory Records, 2004)
An Army of Shapes Between Wars (Victory Records, 2006)
The Ones Who Get It Are the Ones Who Need Not to Know (self-released, 2010)

External links
 Official website
 Official MySpace profile
 Last.fm profile
 Victory Records website
 [ Review of "Don't Cut Your Fabric to This Year's Fashion,"] by AllMusicGuide.com
 [ Review of "An Army of Shapes Between Wars',"] by AllMusicGuide.com
 Burning Stars Interview with Adam Manning & Clarke Foley
 Burning Stars Interview with Mark Thomas Kluepfel

Indie rock musical groups from New York (state)
Musical groups from Long Island
Victory Records artists